Llaingarreglwyd is a hamlet in the  community of Llanarth, Ceredigion, Wales, which is 70 miles (112.6 km) from Cardiff and 185.3 miles (298.1 km) from London. Llaingarreglwyd is represented in the Senedd by Elin Jones (Plaid Cymru) and is part of the Ceredigion constituency in the House of Commons.

See also
 List of localities in Wales by population

References

Villages in Ceredigion